For His Son is a 1912 American short silent drama film directed by D. W. Griffith and starring Blanche Sweet. The film was shot in Fort Lee, New Jersey when Biograph Company and other early film studios in America's first motion picture industry were based there at the beginning of the 20th century. A print of the film survives today.

Cast

 Charles Hill Mailes as The Father, a Physician
 Charles West as The Son
 Blanche Sweet as The Son's Fiancée
 William Bechtel as In Office
 Dorothy Bernard as The Secretary
 W. Christy Cabanne as One of the Son's Friends / At Soda Fountain
 Edward Dillon as At Soda Fountain
 Edna Foster as At Soda Fountain
 Robert Harron as At Soda Fountain
 Dell Henderson as In Office
 Grace Henderson as The Landlady
 Harry Hyde as One of the Son's Friends
 J. Jiquel Lanoe as At Soda Fountain
 Alfred Paget as In Office
 Gus Pixley as At Soda Fountain
 W. C. Robinson as At Soda Fountain
 Ynez Seabury as At Soda Fountain (as Inez Seabury)
 Kate Toncray as At Soda Fountain

See also
 List of American films of 1912
 D. W. Griffith filmography
 Blanche Sweet filmography

References

External links

1912 films
1912 drama films
1912 short films
American silent short films
American black-and-white films
Silent American drama films
Films directed by D. W. Griffith
Films shot in Fort Lee, New Jersey
Biograph Company films
1910s American films